The 1922 Temple Owls football team was an American football team that represented Temple University as an independent during the 1922 college football season. In its first season under head coach M. Francois D'Eliscu, the team compiled a 1–4–1 record.

Schedule

References

Temple
Temple Owls football seasons
Temple Owls football